The County of Victoria, or Victoria County, was a county in the Canadian province of Ontario. It was formed in 1854 as The United Counties of Peterborough and Victoria, and separated from Peterborough in 1863. In 2001, the county was dissolved and reformed as the city of Kawartha Lakes. Though first opened to settlement in 1821, the area that was encompassed by Victoria County has a history of Indian occupation, first by the Hurons.

History 
The history of Victoria County began with the passing of the Constitutional Act in 1791, dividing Canada into two provinces: Upper Canada (present day Ontario) and Lower Canada (present day Québec); and appointing a lieutenant-governor for each.

The first lieutenant-governor of Upper Canada was Colonel John Graves Simcoe, who surveyed the province and set out tracts of land for immigrants with genuine interests. Before the land that became Victoria County could be surveyed, however, speculators had Simcoe removed from office in 1796, and the land was secured from settlement for over 20 years.

Following the War of 1812, a large wave of immigration prompted the province to purchase more land from local Indian tribes. On 5 November 1818, six Mississauga chiefs, Buckquaquet of the Eagles, Pishikinse of the Reindeers, Paudash of the Cranes, Cahgahkishinse of the Pike, Cahgageewin of the Snakes, and Pininse of the White Oaks, met in Port Hope. There they surrendered the rights to over four thousand square kilometres of land, known as the "Mississauga Tract". In exchange, the Indians (numbering about 400) were to receive $750 per year in goods. However, the government later changed this to $10 per year for each living person born before the deal was signed.

The Mississauga Tract included all of Victoria and Peterborough counties, as well as parts of 28 adjacent townships. Following the purchase, the land became Newcastle District in 1802. In 1845, it was renamed Colborne District consisting of the County of Peterborough. In 1851, Peterborough County was divided into the counties of Peterborough and Victoria, which were united for municipal purposes as the United Counties of Peterborough and Victoria.

A plebiscite was authorized in 1856 to facilitate the creation of a provisional county council for Victoria, but, as the united counties council delayed conducting it, a further Act was passed in 1861 to compel its being held, following which the provisional council was formed. and its formal separation took place in 1863.

Further townships were surveyed in the following years that were attached to the County, extending its reach northwards. In 1868, the townships of Ryde, Draper, Macaulay, Stephenson, Brunel, McLean and Oakley were detached from the County and transferred to the new District of Muskoka, and the townships of Stisted, Chaffey, Franklin and Ridout were detached in a similar manner in 1873. They were not withdrawn for municipal purposes until their annexation to Simcoe County in 1877. The townships of Anson, Hindon and Lutterworth were also withdrawn from the County in 1874 and transferred to the new Provisional County of Haliburton.

In 1974, as a result of the creation of the Regional Municipality of Durham, Manvers Township was withdrawn from Durham County and transferred to Victoria County.

On 1 January 2001, Victoria County was dissolved, and its townships and incorporated communities were amalgamated to form the City of Kawartha Lakes, a name chosen because of the prominence of the lakes in the geography of the region.

Organization before amalgamation in 2001
It encompassed

Townships 
Victoria County consisted of 13 separate townships and 6 incorporated villages with their own local governments.

Population centres are listed in parentheses:

Bexley (Victoria Road, Coboconk)
Carden (Dalrymple)
Dalton (Sebright, Uphill, Sadowa)
Eldon (Glenarm)
Emily (Downeyville, Fowlers Corners)
Fenelon (Isaacs Glen, Powles Corners)
Laxton, Digby and Longford (Uphill, Norland)

Longford (uninhabited)
Manvers (Janetville, Bethany)
Mariposa (Oakwood, Little Britain, Manilla)
Ops (Reaboro)
Somerville (Coboconk, Kinmount)
Verulam (Dunsford, Bobcaygeon)

The township of Laxton, Digby and Longford is an amalgamation of the once individual townships of Digby and Laxton, and half of the original Longford Township. The separate township of Longford is uninhabited, though dotted with abandoned logging towns.

Incorporated communities 

Town of Lindsay
Village of Bobcaygeon
Village of Fenelon Falls

Village of Omemee
Village of Sturgeon Point
Village of Woodville

Unincorporated communities and hamlets 

Ancona Point
Argyle
Avery Point
Baddow
Baker Trail
Ballyduff
Barclay
Bellevue
Bethany
Bethel
Birch Point
Bolsover
Brunswick
Burnt River
Burton
Bury's Green
Cambray
Cameron
Camp Kagawong
Campbells Beach

Coboconk
Corsons Siding
Cowan's Bay
Crawfords Beach
Cresswell
Crosshill
Cunningham's Corners
Dalrymple
Dartmoor*
Daytonia Beach
Dunsford
East Emily
Eldon Station
Fairburn Corner
Fee's Landing
Feir Mill
Fell Station
Fingerboard
Fleetwood*
Fowler's Corners

Fox's Corners
Frank Hill
Franklin
Gilsons Point
Glamorgan
Glandine
Glenarm
Glenway Village
Grasshill
Greenhurst-Thurstonia
Hickory Beach
Hillhead Corners
Horncastle*
Hukish
Isaacs Glen
Janetville
Joyvista Estates
Kenedon Park
Krenrei

Kenstone Beach
Keystone Beach
King's Wharf
Kinmount
Kirkfield
Lake Dalrymple
Lancaster Bay
Lifford
Linden Valley
Little Britain
Long Beach
Long Point
Lorneville
Lotus
MacKenzie Point
Mallards Bay
Manilla
Manvers
Mariposa

McCrackin's Beach
McGuire Beach
Newmans Beach
Norland
Oak Hill
Oakdene Point
Oakwood
O'Donnell Landing
Orange Corners
Pickerel Point
Pleasant Point
Pontypool
Port Hoover
Powles Corners
Reaboro
Red Cap Beach
Rohallion
Rokeby
Rosedale

Sadowa
Salem Corners
Sandy Point
Sebright
Silver Lake
Snug Harbour
Southview Estates
Sullivan's Bay
Sylvan Glen Beach
Taylor's Corners
Tracey's Hill
Union Creek
Valentia
Verulam Park
Victoria Place
View Lake
Washburn Island
Watson's Siding
Yelverton

Abandoned towns, post offices and church villages 

Aros
Dongola
Downeyville

Fleetwood Station
Hartley
Head Lake

Islay
Mariposa Station

Mount Horeb*
Palestine

Ragged Rapids*
St. Mary's

Uphill
Zion

Note:

* ghost town

Demographics 

The population is mostly rural, with only 34% living in urban areas.

Infrastructure

Colonization roads 
Victoria County was first opened up to settlement in the 1821.
At this time, the primary routes for entering the county-to-be were narrow trails. Settlers were offered land on the condition that they help further the progress of concession roads into the region. This was often met with the bare minimum, and progress was slow.

The Land Act of 1853 provided funding for the development of roads throughout the wilderness of Upper Canada. Grants were administered by the Department of Agriculture to survey and build the new roads. The roads followed the tradition of old Roman roads, and cut through the wilderness in a straight line, veering only when the terrain was impassable, but cutting through swamps and hills otherwise. Four primary roads were built: the Cameron Road, the Bobcaygeon Road, the Monck Road, and the Portage Road.

http://www.ontariogenealogy.com/Victoria/settleme.html
http://www.ontariogenealogy.com/Victoria/history/victoriacountypioneers2.html

The Cameron road, now mostly encompassed by Highway 35, provided access from Lake Ontario to the northern limits of Victoria;

The Bobcaygeon Road, begun in 1853, traversed north and south along the present-day eastern boundary of the region, and is mostly encompassed by former Highway 121;

The Monck Road, which connected Lake Couchiching to Bancroft, encompassed partially by former Highway 503, now City Road 45;

The Portage Road, connecting Lake Simcoe to Balsam Lake, encompassed entirely by former Highway 48, now City Road 48

Education
At one time the Victoria County Board of Education provided educational services. In 1999 it was amalgamated into the Trillium Lakelands District School Board.

See also
List of townships in Ontario

References 

Former counties in Ontario
Populated places disestablished in 2001